The Evansville metropolitan area is the 164th largest metropolitan statistical area (MSA) in the United States. The primary city is Evansville, Indiana, the third largest city in Indiana and the largest city in Southern Indiana as well as the hub for Southwestern Indiana. Other Indiana cities include Boonville, Mount Vernon, Oakland City, and Princeton. Large towns in Indiana include Chandler, Fort Branch, and Newburgh. It is the primary metropolitan area in the Illinois–Indiana–Kentucky Tri-State Area.

History
It was originally designated the Evansville, Indiana, standard metropolitan area and was formed by the United States Census Bureau in 1950, consisting solely of Vanderburgh County, Indiana. As surrounding counties saw an increase in their population densities and the number of residents employed within Vanderburgh County, they met Census criteria to be added to the MSA. Four Indiana counties and two Kentucky counties are now a part of this MSA.

Because it includes counties in both Indiana and Kentucky, the Evansville metropolitan area is sometimes referred to as "Kentuckiana". The entire region is usually referred to as the Tri-State because of Illinois bordering Posey County less than 20 miles west of Evansville and to distinguish it from the Louisville metropolitan area.

Major employers

Healthcare
 Deaconess Health System, Evansville and Newburgh
 St. Vincent Health, Evansville

Industrial
 Toyota Motor Manufacturing Indiana  Gibson County
 Alcoa   Warrick County
 SABIC, formerly GE Plastics  Posey County
 CenterPoint Energy, formerly Vectren, Operates three power plants in the area in Posey and Warrick Counties.
 Duke Energy Indiana, Operates a power plant in Gibson County.

Current populations

¹ County was not a part of Evansville MSA at the time of this Census and the county's population is not included in MSA total.

See also 
 Southwestern Indiana
 Owensboro metropolitan area
 Illinois–Indiana–Kentucky tri-state area

References

External links
U.S. Census Bureau State & County QuickFacts 

About Metropolitan and Micropolitan Statistical Areas

 
Indiana census statistical areas
Southwestern Indiana